Kizner is a rural locality (a settlement) and the administrative center of Kiznersky District in the Udmurt Republic, Russia. Population: 

It had urban-type settlement status until May 2007.

References

Rural localities in Udmurtia